Camptodactyly-arthropathy-coxa vara-pericarditis syndrome is a rare autosomal recessive genetic medical condition due to a mutation in the gene proteoglycan 4 (PRG4) – a mucin-type glycoprotein that acts as a lubricant for the cartilage surfaces. This gene is also known as lubricin.

Presentation

This condition was first described in 1986. and is a syndrome of camptodactyly, arthropathy, coxa vara, and pericarditis. It may also include congenital cataracts. The cause of this syndrome was discovered in 1999.

Children with this syndrome often present with a joint effusion that is cool and resistant to anti-inflammatory therapy. The arthropathy principally involves large joints such as elbows, hips, knees, and ankles. Pericarditis may be a presenting feature or may occur later in the course of the disease. Coxa vara occurs in 50–90% of cases and noninflammatory pericarditis in 30%.

Genetics

The gene responsible for this condition is located on the long arm of chromosome 1 (1q). The encoded protein is a glycoprotein of ~345 kDa  specifically synthesized by chondrocytes located at the surface of articular cartilage, and also by some synovial lining cells. The cDNA encodes a protein of 1,404 amino acids (human A isoform) with a somatomedin B homology domain, heparin-binding domains, multiple mucin-like repeats, a hemopexin domain, and an aggregation domain. There are 3 consensus sequences for N-glycosylation and 1 chondroitin sulfate substitution site.

Diagnosis

Laboratory

The full blood count, erythrocyte sedimentation rate and C reactive protein are normal.

Synovial fluid is typically viscous, clear, honey-colored, and low in cell count. Synovial histology shows little or no mononuclear infiltration. Mild thickening of the synovium is present and giant cells may be occasionally seen.

Radiology

Large acetabular cysts are common in this condition. Other features include periarticular osteopenia, squaring of metacarpals and phalanges and bilateral joint effusions.

Management

References

External links 

Genetic diseases and disorders
Syndromes